Andrej Petrovský (born 23 January 1992) is a Slovak professional footballer who plays as a defender for Norwegian club Rommen SK.

References

1992 births
Living people
Slovak footballers
Association football defenders
MFK Skalica players
Slovak Super Liga players